Nealcidion omissum is a species of beetle in the family Cerambycidae. It was described by Martins and Monné in 1974.

References

Nealcidion
Beetles described in 1974